Wolfgang Josef Egger (born 13 February 1963) is a car designer from Germany, a former Audi Group head designer, and currently a BYD Group head designer.

Biography
Egger was born in Oberstdorf, Germany, and studied Design at the International College of Arts and Sciences in Milan, Italy. In 1989, he graduated as an industrial designer. Egger began his professional career in 1989 in the Design department at Alfa Romeo. In 1993, he was appointed Chief Designer of Alfa Romeo.

In 1998, he became Chief Designer at SEAT, where he was able to input his personal style in, for example, the SEAT Ibiza, Cordoba and Altea.

In 2001, W. J. Egger was appointed Head of Design at Lancia. In the same year, however, he returned to Alfa Romeo as Chief Designer. Among the cars developed by Alfa Romeo under his direction were the Nuvola Concept, 156, 166, 147 and 8C Competizione..

On 1 May 2007, Egger succeeded Walter Maria de Silva as Head of Audi Group Design. Then he was responsible for the Audi and Lamborghini brands.

On 6 Dec 2013, Egger left Audi design. Egger was replaced by Walter DeSilva who became chief of design for all of VW's makes: Porsche, Audi, Vw Skoda, Seat. In order to lure DeSilva to VW, VW added three Italian makes: Lamborghini,  Ducati and ItalDesign coach house.

In 2017, Egger became design director for BYD. The Chinese automaker appointed him to create their design identity, starting with the hybrid model BYD Song Max and a series of other electric vehicles including the BYD B series bus.

References

1963 births
German automobile designers
Alfa Romeo people
SEAT people
Lancia people
Audi people
Living people
Volkswagen Group designers
BYD Auto